Kamathipura (also spelled Kamthipura)  is a neighbourhood in Mumbai, India known for prostitution. It was first settled after 1795 with the construction of causeways that connected the erstwhile seven islands of Mumbai. Initially known as Lal Bazaar, it got its name from the Kamathis (workers) of other areas of the country, who were labourers on construction sites. Due to tough police crackdowns, in the late 1990s with the rise of AIDS and government's redevelopment policy that helped sex workers to move out of the profession and subsequently out of Kamathipura, the number of sex workers in the area has dwindled. In 1992, Brihanmumbai Municipal Corporation (BMC) recorded there were 45,000 sex workers here which was reduced to 1,600 in 2009 and 500 in 2018. Many sex workers have migrated to other areas in Maharashtra with real estate developers taking over the high-priced real estate. In 2018 the Maharashtra government sought tenders to demolish and redevelop the area.

History

Before the completion of the Hornby Vellard project in 1784, which built a causeway uniting all seven islands of Mumbai under William Hornby, governor of Bombay (1771-1784), plugged the Great Breach in  Mahalaxmi, while the subsequent Bellasis Road causeway joined Mazagaon and Malabar Hill in 1793. This resulted in several low-lying marshy areas of Mumbai Flats like Byculla, Tardeo, Mahalaxmi and Kamathipura opening up for habitation. Thereafter starting 1795, Kamathis (workers) of other areas of the country, working as labourers on construction sites began settling here, giving the area its present name. It was bounded by Bellasis Road on the north, by Gaodevi on the south and the main road across, Falkland Road. At one point during this period it was home to a Chinese community, which worked as dockhands and ran restaurants. By the late 19th century it all changed.

Till then, as previous 1864 Census figures for Mumbai indicate, other areas had a larger population of prostitutes, like Girgaon (1,044), Phanaswadi (1,323) and Oomburkharee (1,583) compared with Kamathipura (601), all which declined after 1864. This small region boasted the most exotic consorts. In the 19th and early 20th centuries, a large number of women from continental Europe and Japan and China were trafficked into Kamathipura, where they worked as prostitutes servicing soldiers and locals alike. Gradually, social stratification also took place: A busy road in Kamathipura was known as Safed Gully (White Lane) owing to the European prostitutes housed here during the British raj. The lane is now known as Cursetji Shuklaji Street. The most well-known brothel in the area, Pila House, is the hybridisation of its original word: Playhouse. The first venereal disease clinic of Bombay was opened in 1916, being taken over by BMC in 1925. Nearby, Bachchuseth ki Wadi on Foras Road was famous for its kothewalis or tawaifs and mujras.

When India gained independence, Indian sex workers moved into the area. In recent decades, large numbers of Nepalese women and girls have also been trafficked into the district. Over the years under Indian government rule, the sex industry in Kamathipura continued to flourish. Trafficking and economic circumstances also brought women from different parts of the country there. Eventually it became Asia's largest sex district.

The brothels in the area are crowded. Sex workers wait outside to pick up customers and then rent an available bed. The estimated 3,000 buildings in the area are largely dilapidated; safe drinking water and sanitation is scarce as well.

Some historical sources point out that the origin of slums, subsequently the red-light areas of Mumbai including Kamathipura is related to land acquisition, from the indigenous population who were evicted from their farmlands and cattle-fields and forced to live in congested conditions, to facilitate the development of the industrial harbor city. In the early stages, people accumulated in the new slums partly depended on constructions contracts. Later, as men became unemployed due to lack of jobs, more women began to engage in sex work in order to survive. Gang activity also increased in the area; in the 1970s and early '80s, Bachchu Wadi at Kamathipura was frequented by gangleaders from the Mumbai underworld, such as Haji Mastan, Karim Lala, and Dawood Ibrahim.

In 2005, with a statewide ban on dance bars, many dancing girls, who couldn't find other means of income, moved to prostitution to survive, in Mumbai's red-light districts, like Kamathipura. According to police, in 2005, there were 100,000 prostitutes working out of five-star hotels and brothels across Mumbai.

The area is also home to a small cottage industry of about 200 women who make a living rolling beedis (hand-rolled Indian cigarette).

Demographics

Kamathipura is divided into roughly 14 lanes and divided according to regional backgrounds of the workers. Most of the workers come from other Indian states. There is little interaction between areas, which makes it harder for social organizations to organize them into a movement or union. Further, lack of public opinion, political leadership or social activism which is empathetic towards them means a tough time forming unions.

The area had 55,936 voters in 2007.

Image gallery

See also
  
 Prostitution in India
 Prostitution in Asia 
 Prostitution in Kolkata 
 Prostitution in Mumbai 
 Sonagachi 
 All Bengal Women's Union
 Durbar Mahila Samanwaya Committee 
 Male prostitution

Notes

References
 
 
 
 
 Björkman, Lisa, and Ratoola Kundu. “NIRMALA: KAMATHIPURA’S GATEKEEPER.” Bombay Brokers, edited by LISA BJÖRKMAN, Duke University Press, 2021, pp. 145–53, .

External links

The day my God died - Documentary by PBS
Frontline interview with Raney Aronson
Frontline - INDIA - The Sex Workers, 2004
Watch YouTube documentary on a school in Kamathipura

Prostitution in India  
Neighbourhoods in Mumbai
Red-light districts in India